NGC 4163, also known as NGC 4167, is a dwarf irregular galaxy in the constellation Canes Venatici, about 9.65 million light-years away. It was discovered by William Herschel on April 28, 1785 as NGC 4163. John Herschel discovered it again on March 11, 1831 as NGC 4167. It has a size on the night sky of 1.9' x 1.6', which, at its distance, gives a diameter of 4000 light-years. This galaxy consists of young blue stars. It is a member of the M94 Group.

References

External links
 

Irregular galaxies
4163
38881
Canes Venatici
07199
M94 Group